An earworm is a piece of music that repeats compulsively within one's mind.

Earworm may also refer to:

 Earworm Records, a British record label
 DJ Earworm, an American mashup artist
 "Earworm" (SpongeBob SquarePants), an episode of SpongeBob SquarePants

See also
 Corn earworm (disambiguation)
 Earwig (disambiguation)
 Star Trek II: The Wrath of Khan, a science fiction film that featured an eel that entered its victims through their ears